Hazelslack is a hamlet in the South Lakeland district, in the English county of Cumbria. It is near the villages of Arnside and Storth.

Nearby Hazelslack Tower is the ruins of a 14th-century building, and is Grade II listed. It has been described as a peel tower and is a Scheduled Monument. As of 2014, English Heritage considered the condition of the privately owned tower to be very bad.

Hazelslack also has a camp site.

See also

Listed buildings in Beetham

References 

Hamlets in Cumbria
Beetham